First Love (Italian: Primo Amore) is an Italian 2004 erotic body horror drama film directed by Matteo Garrone and Massimo Gaudioso, loosely based on the autobiographical novel by Marco Mariolini. The film deals with anorexia nervosa.

Plot
Vittorio, a Veronese goldsmith, meets Sonia through a blind date; the two begin to date and thereby to get to know each other, notwithstanding some initial doubts about the possibility of success of their relationship: Vittorio is having therapy due to his obsession with thin women up to the point of anorexia.  Their relationship continues as Sonia agrees to lose weight — ignoring the man’s neurosis — which she seemingly does as an act of love, not through her own desire.

What at first seems only a benign choice turns into a nightmare for Sonia, made worse because the two have chosen to live together.  Vittorio becomes increasingly suspicious of Sonia, thinking (somewhat correctly) that she eats in secret.  He therefore hides the food in her house such that she can only eat salad and vegetables.

Sonia becomes very thin, and begins to dislike herself.  Her imprisonment becomes increasingly difficult and begins to be detrimental to her health.  Due to the shared obsession with her weight, the two often find themselves in embarrassing situations in public.  Furthermore, Vittorio’s business is getting worse and worse, ultimately leading to the closure of his laboratory.

One evening Sonia has a crisis in a restaurant, due to her hunger.  On returning home, Vittorio loses his temper and humiliates her, forcing her to be naked and throwing the food she had managed to hide into the fire.  Having reached the limit, Sonia takes advantage of a moment of distraction from Vittorio, grabs a club, and hits him on the head.

Production
Michela Cescon actually lost 15 kilograms (over 30 pounds) in weight during the making of the film, as the director wanted.

Awards

The score won Banda Osiris the 2004 Silver Berlin Bear for Best Film Music. The band won at other festivals, too. At the Flaiano Film Festival, Michela Cescon won for Best Actress and Marco Onorato won for Best Cinematography.

Reception

The film "has been described as “a horror movie about desire,” which seems fitting." Kevin Thomas of the Los Angeles Times finds this film "an elegantly told tale of obsession that, in failing to take on any larger meaning, rapidly becomes depressing to watch." Thomas and others are confused as to "why she [Sonia] strives so mightily to please someone so obviously insane."

See also 
 List of Italian films of 2004

References

External links 
 

2004 films
2004 drama films
2000s erotic drama films
2000s Italian-language films
Films directed by Matteo Garrone
Body image in popular culture
Italian erotic drama films
Anorexia nervosa
Italian erotic horror films
Body horror films
2000s Italian films
Fandango (Italian company) films